Bradley David Gamble (born 4 February 1975) is an English former footballer who played as a forward in the Football League for Leyton Orient and in non-league football for Welling United.

References

1975 births
Living people
Footballers from Southwark
English footballers
Association football forwards
Leyton Orient F.C. players
Welling United F.C. players
Fisher Athletic F.C. players
English Football League players